DEQ can refer to
 Delivered Ex Quay, an Incoterm
 Department of Environmental Quality, any of various U.S. state agencies:
 Arkansas Department of Environmental Quality
 Idaho Department of Environmental Quality
 Louisiana Department of Environmental Quality
 Michigan Department of Environmental Quality
 Oklahoma Department of Environmental Quality
 Oregon Department of Environmental Quality
 Utah Department of Environmental Quality
 J. Lynn Helms Sevier County Airport, De Queen, Arkansas, United States
 Deqing Moganshan Airport, in Zhejiang, China
Double-ended queue
Deq (tattoo), traditional Kurdish tattoos